Southeast is a compass point.

Southeast, south-east, south east, southeastern, south-eastern, or south eastern may also refer to:
Southeast (direction), an intercardinal direction

Places 
 Southeast Asia
 South East of South Australia
 South East Tasmania, Australia
 South East Delhi district
 South-East District, Botswana
 Southeast Region, Brazil
 South East England
 Southeast Township, Indiana, United States
 Southeast Ireland
 South East London (disambiguation)
 South Eastern Region, Malta
 South East Nigeria
 Southeast, New York, United States
 Southeastern New York, United States
 Southeastern, Pennsylvania, United States
 South-East, Russian SFSR (1920–1924), a former administrative division
 South East San Diego, United States
 South East District, Singapore
 Southeast Turkey
 Southeastern United States
 Southeastern Vietnam, or Đông Nam Bộ
 Southeast, Washington, D.C., United States

Schools 
 Southeastern University (disambiguation)
 Southeastern Louisiana University
 Southeastern Baptist Theological Seminary, North Carolina

Rail transport 
 South Eastern Railway zone, one of eighteen Indian railway zones
 South Eastern Railway (England), railway company from 1836 to 1899
 South Eastern and Chatham Railway, successor of the English South Eastern Railway from 1899 to 1923
 Connex South Eastern, English train company from 1996 to 2003
 South Eastern Trains, English train company from 2003 to 2006
 Southeastern (train operating company 2006–2021), English train company from 2006 to 2021
 Southeastern (train operating company), English train company commencing operations in 2021
 South Eastern franchise, railway franchise in South East England
 South Eastern Main Line, major railway route between London and Dover in England

Other uses 
 South East Motor Corporation, a motor vehicle manufacturer in Fuzhou, China
 Southeast (Metro-North station), railway station serving Southeast, New York
 Southeast Division (NBA), National Basketball Association
 Southeastern (album), by Jason Isbell

See also
Sud-Est (disambiguation), French for "southeast"
Yugo-Vostochny (disambiguation), Russian for "southeastern"

Orientation (geometry)

id:Tenggara